The Allman Betts Band is an American rock group.  Formed in November 2018, it includes the sons of three founding members of the Allman Brothers Band – Devon Allman (son of Gregg Allman), Duane Betts (son of Dickey Betts), and Berry Duane Oakley (son of Berry Oakley).  The band plays mostly original songs, with some covers of Allman Brothers songs mixed in.  They have toured nationally and internationally, and have released two albums – Down to the River (2019) and Bless Your Heart (2020).

The members of the Allman Betts band are Devon Allman (guitar, vocals), Duane Betts (guitar, vocals), Berry Duane Oakley (bass, vocals), Johnny Stachela (guitar, vocals), John Ginty (keyboards), R. Scott Bryan (percussion, vocals), and John Lum (drums). 

On January 25, 2022, the band reported that they'd be taking a break from recording and touring and would be working on solo material.

Discography 
 Down to the River – June 28, 2019 – BMG
 Bless Your Heart – August 28, 2020 – BMG

References

External links 

American country rock groups
Jam bands
American southern rock musical groups